Yamazakia is a genus of flowering plants belonging to the family Linderniaceae.

Its native range is from tropical and subtropical Asia to northern Australia.

Species:
 Yamazakia pusilla (Willd.) W.R.Barker, Y.S.Liang & Wannan 
 Yamazakia viscosa (Hornem.) W.R.Barker, Y.S.Liang & Wannan

References

Linderniaceae
Lamiales genera